WVNA-FM (105.5 MHz) is a radio station licensed to Muscle Shoals, Alabama. The format is mainstream rock. On air, the station refers to itself as Rock 105.5, The Big Dog. WVNA-FM serves the Florence-Muscle Shoals Metropolitan Area. The station is owned by Mike Self, through licensee Singing River Media Group, LLC, and is part of a six station cluster operated by Singing River Media in North Alabama/Southern Tennessee.

The WVNA call letters stand for "(The) Voice of North Alabama".

Programming on the radio station includes Bob & Tom in the morning, local personality Ash mid-days, T.C. Kinkead afternoons and Alice Cooper at night. Other personalities on the station include Dee Snider, Bob Colburn, Harlan, Little Steven Van Zandt, Matt Pinfield and Full Metal Jackie.

The station's Program and Music Director is T.C. Kinkead. Brian Rickman is the Operations Manager.

References

External links
 Official Website
 

VNA-FM
Florence–Muscle Shoals metropolitan area
Mainstream rock radio stations in the United States
Radio stations established in 1978
1978 establishments in Alabama